Bahramabad (also Romanized as Bahrāmābād) is a village in Beygom Qaleh Rural District, in the Central District of Naqadeh County, West Azerbaijan Province, Iran. At the 2006 census, its population was 150, in 19 families.

References 

Populated places in Naqadeh County